(Midnight mass for Christmas), H.9 (see note ), is a mass for four voices and orchestra by Marc-Antoine Charpentier, written in 1694 based on the melodies of ten French Christmas carols. Charpentier called for eight soloists, a duo of two sopranos and two trios of alto, tenor and bass, but it can be performed by five soloists. Choir and orchestra are in four parts, scored for flutes, strings (violins and viols), organ and basso continuo. The mass is regarded as a unique work in both the composer's work and in the genre. While in Charpentier's time, the mass was performed by all-male choirs, it has later been performed and recorded also by mixed choirs with modern instruments.

History 

Charpentier composed the   1694 for the Jesuit church of the Église Saint-Louis in Paris where he was music director. He upheld a longstanding tradition for this mass to be celebrated around midnight as the first of three on Christmas Day: to base the music on melodies of French noëls (Christmas carols). Some of these tunes were secular in origin, and in theory the use of secular material in church music had been forbidden by the Council of Trent, but long traditions were tolerated. Charpentier had written instrumental version of nine carols, of which he used seven also for the mass. The texts of the mass ordinary were matched with ten carol tunes. The music is set for four vocal parts and a small orchestra of two flutes, strings and organ.

Publication 
Charpentier's manuscript is held by the Bibliothèque nationale de France. Eulenberg brought out an edition in 1996. This was claimed to be an urtext edition, although that description has been disputed. A critical edition was produced by Carus-Verlag in 2016.

Scoring and structure 
Charpentier structured the mass in several movements. He scored it for soloists and choir, two  flutes, two violins, two violas, bass, organ and basso continuo. In his wording, the voices are dessus, haute-contre (high tenor), taille (tenor) and bass, which were all male singers at his time. Modern performances also use SATB mixed choirs. Charpentier called for instruments: "2 flutes, 2 violons, 2 altos, basses, orgue, et basse-continue. Flutes could be recorders which might correspond to pastoral music, but the range is better suited to flauto traverso; "violons" are violins; altos and tailles stand for alto and tenor viols; basses or "basses de choeur" mean a bass viol that goes with the vocal bass in choral movements. The instrumental music is in four parts and basso continuo, with the flutes and violins playing in the soprano range. Some vocal parts are marked for soloists ("seule"), always in groups: a duo of two sopranos, or a trio of alto, tenor and bass. He thought of two of the trio groups, so eight soloists, but the music can also be performed by only one trio, which makes for five soloists, SSATB. The mass takes about 25 minutes to perform.

Kyrie
 1. Kyrie I "Joseph est bien marié" ("")
 2. Christe eleison "Or nous dites, Marie"
 3. Kyrie II "Une jeune pucelle"
Gloria
 4. Et in terra pax
 5. Laudamus te "Tous les bourgeois de Chatres"
 6. Gratias agimus tibi
 7. Domine Deus Rex coelestis
 8. Quoniam tu solus Sanctus "Où s'en vont ces gais bergers" ("")
 9. Amen
Credo
 10. Patrem omnipotentem
 11. Deum de Deo "Vous qui désirez"
 12. Genitum non factum
 13. Et incarnatus est
 14. Crucifixus "Voici le jour solennel de Noël"
 15. Et ascendit in coelum
 16. Et in Spiritum Sanctum "A la venue de Noël"
 17. Et unam sanctam
Sanctus e Benedictus
 18. Sanctus "O dieu ! Que n'ètait-je en vie"
 19. Benedictus
Agnus Dei  
 20. Agnus Dei "A minuit fut fait un réveil"

Some of the sections use a single carol, including Kyrie I, for which Charpentier quoted a cheerful carol first unchanged and repeated, then with different instrumentation and some imitation, then in two more again different treatments. In Kyrie II, he does not quote the carol completely but only the beginning for imitation music. He did not write a Kyrie III, but the organ would repeat the carol from Kyrie 1.

Recordings 
The  H.9 was recorded by the Choir of King's College, Cambridge, and the English Chamber Orchestra conducted by David Willcocks in 1967, and in 1988 by the Choir of St John's College, Cambridge, and the City of London Sinfonia, conducted by George Guest.

The mass was recorded, with other Christmas music (H.416) by Charpentier including four instrumental settings (H.531 n°2, H.534 n°3,4,6) of carols used in the mass, in 2002 by Les Arts Florissants Chorus and Orchestra, conducted by William Christie.

Notes 
1.Charpentier's compositions were catalogued by H. Wiley Hitchcock in his Les œuvres de Marc-Antoine Charpentier: Catalogue Raisonné, (Paris: Picard, 1982); references to works are often accompanied by their H (for Hitchcock) number.

References

External links 
 

Compositions by Marc-Antoine Charpentier
Masses (music)
Christmas music
1694 compositions